The Salish Mountains are located in the northwest corner of the U.S. State of Montana. Much of the range is bordered on the east by Flathead Lake. With peaks ranging from just under 7,000 feet tall to named hills that are a little short of 3,600 feet in elevation the Salish Mountain range is a lesser known mountain range in northwestern Montana. Many of the peaks in the range are rounded tree-covered summits but occasionally the mountain summits are found on open grassy slopes that afford great views into the surrounding valleys and neighboring mountain ranges. The Salish Mountains cover a triangle-shaped land mass of about 4,125 square miles of lush forests and peaks.

The Salish Mountains are named for the Native Americans who called this area their home for centuries before white man settled here. The Salish originated in the Pacific Northwest and were called the Flathead Indians by the first white men who came to the Columbia River. The Flatheads call themselves Salish meaning "the people".

Although never a large tribe, the Salish had a reputation for bravery, honesty, and general high character and for their friendly disposition towards the whites. When first known, about the beginning of the last century, they subsisted chiefly by hunting and the gathering of wild roots, particularly camas, dwelt in skin tipis or mat-covered lodges, and were at peace with all tribes excepting their hereditary enemies, the powerful Blackfeet who lived across the continental divide on the Great Plains.

See also
List of mountain ranges in Montana

Notes

Mountain ranges of Montana
Landforms of Lincoln County, Montana